Saw Mon Hla was a principal queen of King Anawrahta of Pagan. She is known in Burmese history for her beauty and her eventual exile instigated by other rival queens. Her story is still part of popular Burmese theater, and she is portrayed as a sad romantic figure.

The queen was daughter of the saopha (chief) of Maw Shan State, located between Pagan and Nanzhao Kingdom (present day Yunnan). The native stories of Hsipaw (Thibaw) and Hsenwi (Theinni) claim Saw Mon Hla as their princess.

In c. 1058, Anawrahta led an expedition to Nanzhao. After his return from Nanzhao expedition, the king was presented with Saw Mon Hla by the chief of Maw Shan State presented his daughter. At Pagan, Saw Mon Hla quickly became the king's favorite queen.

Built a Shwesayan Pagoda
According to the Burmese chronicles, the beautiful young queen was driven out by her rival queens who were jealous of her status as Anawrahta's favorite. Her rivals accused her as a witch. Therefore, Saw Min Hla inconvenience Anawrahta, and return to her homeland Maw. 

On her return to her birthplace, Sae Lant village in Northern Maw Shan State, One of her earrings, which enshrined a relic of the Buddha, dropped into the stream and dozens of golden sparrows appeared and encircled the spot where the earring fell. The stream is called "Na Daung Kya", which translates to “the earring fell into”. She built a pagoda near the riverbank (located in the present day Patheingyi, Mandalay), preserving her earrings and the Buddha relic, with its façade facing east toward her birthplace in Shan State. When King Anawrahta heard the news, soldiers were dispatched and ordered to kill her if the façade of the pagoda faced east, and to set her free if it faced west, where Pagan is located.

Saw Mon Hla heard the news, and in order to save herself, made a solemn wish and used her emerald shawl to turn the pagoda to face directly between east and west. The legend says that the queen was set free after the soldiers saw that the pagoda wasn’t facing Shan State. The pagoda was named Shwesayan, which translates to “encircled by golden sparrows". A remorseful Anawrahta is said to have donated the surrounding land to the pagoda towards the end of his reign.

Spiritual life

Some people believe Sao Mon Hla, who died at her home near Hsipaw, along with her brother, became an guardian Nat (spirit) who protect the Pagan-style pagoda to present day. There is a Nat shrine near the Shwesayan Pagoda, which has a statue of Sao Mon Hla and her brother. Some people believe it is a shrine for the spirits and that if they make offerings, the spirits will bless them. Paying respect to the spirits of Sao Mon Hla and her brother at Shwe Sar Yan Pagoda has drawn more visitors than other pagoda festivals.

References

Queens consort of Pagan
11th-century Burmese women
11th-century Tai people